Dendrosenecio is a genus of flowering plants in the sunflower family. It is a segregate of Senecio, in which it formed the subgenus Dendrosenecio. Its members, the giant groundsels, are native to the higher altitude zones of ten mountain groups in equatorial East Africa, where they form a conspicuous element of the flora.

Description
They have a giant rosette habit, with a terminal leaf rosette at the apex of a stout woody stem. When they bloom, the flowers form a large terminal inflorescence. Concomitantly, two to four lateral branches are normally initiated. As a result, old plants have the appearance of candelabras the size of telephone poles, each branch with a terminal rosette.

Species
Dendrosenecio varies geographically between mountain ranges, and altitudinally on a single mountain. There has been disagreement among botanists as to which populations of Dendrosenecio warrant recognition as species, and which should be relegated to the status of subspecies or variety. The following list, taken from Knox & Palmer will be used for articles about this genus.

 Dendrosenecio adnivalis (Stapf) E.B.Knox (1993)
 Dendrosenecio battiscombei (R.E.Fr. & T.C.E.Fr.) E.B.Knox (1993)
 Dendrosenecio brassiciformis (R.E.Fr. & T.C.E.Fr.) Mabb. (1986)
 Dendrosenecio cheranganiensis (Cotton & Blakelock) E.B.Knox (1993)
 Dendrosenecio elgonensis (T.C.E.Fr.) E.B.Knox (1993)
 Dendrosenecio erici-rosenii (R.E.Fr. & T.C.E.Fr.) E.B.Knox (1993)
 Dendrosenecio johnstonii (Oliv.) B.Nord. (1978)
 Dendrosenecio keniensis (Baker f.) Mabb. (1986)
 Dendrosenecio keniodendron (R.E.Fr. & T.C.E.Fr.) B.Nord. (1978)
 Dendrosenecio kilimanjari (Mildbr.) E.B.Knox (1993)
 Dendrosenecio meruensis (Cotton & Blakelock) E.B.Knox (1993)

Distribution

The giant groundsels are found in the alpine zone of the mountains of equatorial East Africa - Mount Kilimanjaro and Mount Meru in Tanzania, Mount Kenya, the Aberdare Range, and Cherangani Hills in Kenya, Mount Elgon on the Uganda/Kenya border, the Rwenzori Mountains on the Uganda/Democratic Republic of Congo (DRC) border, the Virunga Mountains on the borders of Rwanda, Uganda and the DRC, and Mitumba Mountains (Mount Kahuzi and Mount Muhi) in the east of the DRC.

With the exception of D. eric-rosenii, which occurs on several of the mountains of the Albertine Rift (Rwenzori, Virunga and Mitumba Mountains), and D. battiscombei and D. keniodendron, which are shared by Mount Kenya and the Aberdare Range, the species are individually confined to a single range. In several of the ranges different species, or subspecies, are found at different heights.

Distribution chart
 (after Knox & Palmer)

Evolution and adaptation
The mountains of central and eastern Africa are an almost ideal model system for studying speciation and adaptation in plants.  The mountains  rise far above the surrounding plains and plateaus,
tall enough to reach above the tree line
forming "islands in the sky" or isolated habitats.
These predominantly volcanic peaks further simplify the model by their age and arrangement around the Lake Victoria basin and proximity to the equator.

The species found on Mount Kenya are by far the best model for altitudinal variation.  Dendrosenecio keniodendron is the species which grows at the highest of altitudes, Dendrosenecio keniensis is found at the lower altitudes of the range where the species grows and Dendrosenecio battiscombei grows at the same altitudes as D. keniensis but in the wetter environments.  The other mountains which are not tall enough to have a "big one at the top" have the two, one species for the drier land and one for the damper environments or just one because the environment is not so extreme.  This simplification works extremely well as an introduction to the giant groundsel of East Africa with one exception, Kilimanjaro who has the one species that lives at the top and only one species that lives below; subspecies and varieties living in the moister environments.
 Gridded Adaptive Speciation Studies Each mountain has a vertical gradient of precipitation and temperature fluctuations. Each mountain providing its own vertically placed array of isolated habitats.

In addition to the simplified environmental variables, these mountains are easily described for biogeographic analysis as their age and arrangement around the Lake Victoria basin make it easy to disentangle the effects of time and position.
 Vegetation zones
 

 In the altitudes between 3400 meters (11,000 feet) and 4500 meters (15,000 feet) some of the most extreme examples of adaptations can be found, which include:
 Massive leaf rosettes in which leaf development occurs in a large "apical bud"
 Water storage in the pith of the stem
 Insulation of the stem by retaining withered and dead foliage
 Secretion and impoundment of ice-nucleating polysaccharide fluids (a natural anti-freeze)
 Nyctinastic leaf movement (the leaves close when it gets cold)

 At altitudes below 3400 meters (12,000 feet)the daily temperature fluctuations are less extreme, the average daily temperature steadily increases, and the growth forms and ecology of the Dendroseneico reflect the increased influence of biotic factors (such as competition for light) over abiotic factors (such as nightly frost).

 3400-3800 meters (11,000-12,000 feet) Given the name Afro-alpine region by Hauman in 1955. There is a sharp boundary at 3400 meters (3000 meters on the North side) that separates the forest from the lower alpine zone, the environment is a moorland (low growing vegetation on acidic soils) and it is here that the Dendrosenecio start to grow among the mountain tussocks and sedges.
 Dendrosenecio keniensis grows in this region on Mount Kenya.  A variety or subspecies of Dendrosenecio johnstonii live within this altitude range on all three of the tallest mountains.
 3800-4500 meters (12,000-15,000 ft) The upper moorlands; this is where most of the D. brassica make their homes on all three of the mountains, living with tough dwarf shrubs.
 4300-5000 meters (14,000-16,000 ft) Dendrosenecio woodlands, where each mountain has its own special variety. Dendrosenecio keniensis on Mount Kenya, Dendrosenecio kilimanjari on Mount Kilimanjaro and other species each on their own mountain.
 4500 meters-peak (15,000 ft) Populations of Dendrosenecio start to dwindle.  Mount Kenya has the least vegetation in its upper parts due to its freezing temperatures.

 Dispersal and establishment

 Biogeographic interpretation of the molecular phylogeny suggests that in the most recent one million years, the first giant senecios established themselves at higher elevations of Mount Kilimanjaro and became the species D. kilimanjari.  As they moved down that mountain, adapting to live in the different environment at the lower altitudes of Mount Kilimanjaro, they became a new species, D. johnstonii.  Some seeds found a way to Mount Meru and established themselves as the species D. meruensis, others found a way to get from Mount Kilimanjaro to the Aberdare Range and established themselves as D. battiscombei.  D. battiscombei migrated into the wet alpine habitat on the Aberdares resulted in the formation of the species D. brassiciformis.  Dispersal from the Aberdares to Mount Kenya established a second isolated population of D. battiscombei.  Altitudinal speciation on Mount Kenya resulted in the formation of D. keniodendron and the "dwarf" D. keniensis.  Dispersal from Mount Kenya back to the Aberdares established a second insular population of D. keniodendron.  Dispersal from the Aberdares to the Cherangani Hills established two subspecies of D. cheranganiensis: D. cheranganiensis subsp. cheranganiensis and altitudinal (sub)speciation into the web alpine habitat resulted in D. cheranganiensis subsp. dalei.  Dispersal from the Aberdares to Mount Elgon established D. elgonensis which is a point where several subspecies diverge and disperse: from Mount Elgon to the Virunga Mountains established D. erici-rosenii; from Mount Elgon to Mount Kahuzi (Mitumba Mountains) established a second population of D. erici-rosenii and dispersal from the Virunga Mountains to the Ruwenzori Mountains established a third population.

Parallel evolution
The communities of giant Dendrosenecio and giant lobelias found on these African mountains are an exceptional example of parallel or convergent evolution and repeated convergent evolution between these two groups;  providing evidence that the unusual features of these plants are an evolutionary response to a challenging habitat and an environment which can be easily described for biogeographic analysis.

Cytological uniformity
Little variation was found in molecular phylogeny among the 40 recorded giant senecio collections (40 accessions), yet as a group they differ significantly from Cineraria deltoidea, the closest known relative.
The gametophytic chromosome number (is the number of chromosomes in each cell) for the giant Dendrosenecio is n = 50, and for the giant lobelias. Specifically Lobeliaceae, Lobelia subgenus Tupa section Rhynchopetalum it is n = 14. Only five of the 11 species of giant senecio and three of the 21 species of giant lobelia from eastern Africa remain uncounted. Although both groups are polyploid, Dendrosenecio is presumed to be decaploid (ten sets; 10x) and the Lobelia more certainly tetraploid (four sets; 4x), their adaptive radiations involved no further change in chromosome number. The cytological uniformity within each group, while providing circumstantial evidence that they descended from a single ancestor and simplifying interpretations of cladistic analyses, provides neither positive nor negative support for a possible role of polyploidy in evolving the giant-rosette growth-form.

References

External links

 
 

 
Asteraceae genera